Trismelasmos cinerosa is a moth in the family Cossidae. It was described by Roepke in 1955. It is found in New Guinea. The habitat consists of both lowland and mountainous areas.

References

Zeuzerinae
Moths described in 1955